Euclid is an unincorporated community in Calhoun County, West Virginia, United States. Its post office  has closed.

The community was named after Dalton Euclid Reip, the son of a man credited with securing the town a post office.

References 

Unincorporated communities in West Virginia
Unincorporated communities in Calhoun County, West Virginia